The Global Species List Working Group (GSLWG) is a non-profit organization and non-governmental organization, founded in 2020, developed under the umbrella of the IUBS with the aim of creating a governance system that imbues global taxon lists with a legitimacy and authority respected by both taxonomists and the users of taxonomy. The organization was developed in response to several publications that demonstrated the need for stability in the names of species. The founding meeting was held in Charles Darwin University in Darwin, Australia in January 2020.

The initial impetus for the group arose from an opinion piece published in the journal Nature by Stephen Garnett and Les Christidis. This piece aroused backlash within the taxonomic community with fears of unnecessary governance being proposed on the science of taxonomy. In a response with 184 authors led by Scott Thomson and Richard Pyle discussion followed. Efforts to reconcile the differences of opinion was made and four authors of these two pieces came to a consensus in the formulation of a new approach to the stabilization of species nomenclature.

Objectives 

The primary objective of the GSLWG is to create a governance system that gives global taxon lists a legitimacy and authority respected by both taxonomists and the users of taxonomy. This objective is being pursued through the promotion of 10 principles for creating species lists:

. The species list must be based on science and free from nontaxonomic considerations and interference.
. Governance of the species list must aim for community support and use.
. All decisions about list composition must be transparent.
. The governance of validated lists of species is separate from the governance of the naming of species.
. Governance of lists of accepted species must not strain academic freedom.
. The set of criteria considered sufficient to recognize species boundaries may appropriately vary between different taxonomic groups but should be consistent when possible.
. A global list must balance conflicting needs for currency and stability by having archived versions.
. Contributors need appropriate recognition.
. List content should be traceable.
. A global listing process needs both to encompass global diversity and to accommodate local knowledge of that diversity.
The GSLWG is working closely with the Catalogue of Life (COL) as they have already achieved a large aggregation of species within their list after 20 years of experience.

Publications

The developments that led to the formation of this working group came about over a three-year period from 2017 to 2018, these were essentially a debate on the need of some means to stabilise the names being used for species. This was important for purposes of End Users of the science of Taxonomy such as Lawmakers, Conservation Programs, Medicine, Environmental Agencies etc. The principal publications of note here were:

Since the formation of the Global Species List Working Group development has been underway to describe and define how the unfinished achievement of Linnaeus can be achieved, that is a complete list of all species. To date the publications are as follows:

The last six publications were released as a special Volume of the journal Organisms Diversity & Evolution.

References

Biology organizations
International scientific organizations
Scientific organizations established in 2020